Postcards from the Edge is a 1990 American comedy-drama film directed by Mike Nichols. The screenplay by Carrie Fisher is based on her 1987 semi-autobiographical novel of the same title. The film stars Meryl Streep, Shirley MacLaine, and Dennis Quaid.

Plot
Actress Suzanne Vale is a recovering drug addict trying to rebuild her acting career and life after overcoming a cocaine-Percodan addiction. After overdosing on a date, her mother admitted her to a rehab center from the emergency room. When Suzanne is ready to return to work, her agent informs her that the studio's insurance policy will cover her only if she lives with a "responsible" individual, such as her mother, Doris Mann. However, Suzanne is hesitant to return to her manipulative, self-absorbed mother, with whom she has struggled to escape since growing up in her shadow.

Producer Jack Faulkner, who drove Suzanne to the hospital during her last overdose, runs into her on set and confesses his love for her. They go on a date, but Suzanne's euphoria is short-lived when she discovers that Jack is also sleeping with another actress. Meanwhile, Suzanne's sleazy business manager, Marty Wiener, has taken all her money. In the midst of these struggles, Suzanne learns that the paternalistic director Lowell Kolchek has more work for her as long as she stays sober.

However, Suzanne's troubles escalate when she discovers that her mother has crashed her car while drunk. Suzanne rushes to her bedside and they have a heart-to-heart conversation while Suzanne fixes her makeup and conceals her bloodied wig with a scarf. Doris musters her courage and faces the waiting media. Meanwhile, Suzanne runs into Dr. Frankenthal, who had helped her after her last overdose, and he invites her to see a movie. Suzanne declines, saying she's not ready to date yet, but Dr. Frankenthal tells her he's willing to wait.

The film concludes with Suzanne performing a country western song in Lowell Kolchek's new film.

Cast

Fisher said in the DVD commentary that Jerry Orbach filmed a scene as Suzanne's father, which was later cut.

Production
In discussing adapting the book for the screen, director Mike Nichols commented, "For quite a long time we pushed pieces around, but then we went with the central story of a mother passing the baton to her daughter." He added "Carrie doesn't draw on her life any more than Flaubert did. It's just that his life wasn't so well known."

Nichols began pre-production in New York, where he assembled a group of actors to run lines from the script in order to perfect it. In return the actors, one of whom was Annette Bening, were given small roles in the movie when it filmed.

Responding to questions about how closely the film's Suzanne/Doris relationship parallels her relationship with her mother, Debbie Reynolds, Carrie Fisher stated "I wrote about a mother actress and a daughter actress. I'm not shocked that people think it's about me and my mother. It's easier for them to think I have no imagination for language, just a tape recorder with endless batteries." In the DVD commentary she notes that her mother wanted to portray Doris but Nichols cast Shirley MacLaine instead. In her 2013 autobiography, Unsinkable, Reynolds noted that Nichols told her, "You're not right for the part."

Blue Rodeo accompanied Meryl Streep on "I'm Checkin' Out", written by Shel Silverstein. Other songs performed in the film include "I'm Still Here" (sung by MacLaine) and "You Don't Know Me" (sung by Streep).

Reception

Box office
The film opened in 1,013 theaters in the United States and Canada on September 14, 1990 and grossed $7,871,856 in its opening weekend, ranking number 1 at the US box office. It eventually grossed $39,071,603 in the US and Canada and $24.3 million internationally, for a worldwide total of $63.4 million.

Critical response
The film earned positive reviews from critics and holds an 83% rating on Rotten Tomatoes based on 36 reviews, with an average rating of 7.1/10. The critical consensus read, "Uniting a pair of powerhouse talents with a smart, sharply written script, Postcards from the Edge makes compelling drama out of reality-inspired trauma". Metacritic gave the movie a score of 71 based on 18 reviews, indicating "generally favorable reviews". Audiences polled by CinemaScore gave the film an average grade of "A-" on an A+ to F scale.

Vincent Canby of The New York Times said the film "seems to have been a terrifically genial collaboration between the writer and the director, Miss Fisher's tale of odd-ball woe being perfect material for Mr. Nichols's particular ability to discover the humane sensibility within the absurd."

Roger Ebert of the Chicago Sun-Times observed, "What's disappointing about the movie is that it never really delivers on the subject of recovery from addiction. There are some incomplete, dimly seen, unrealized scenes in the rehab center, and then desultory talk about offscreen AA meetings. But the film is preoccupied with gossip; we're encouraged to wonder how many parallels there are between the Streep and MacLaine characters and their originals, Fisher and Debbie Reynolds... Postcards from the Edge contains too much good writing and too many good performances to be a failure, but its heart is not in the right place."

Hal Hinson of The Washington Post said, "Meryl Streep gives the most fully articulated comic performance of her career, the one she's always hinted at and made us hope for." He felt the film's earlier section was "the movie's best, primarily because Nichols is so focused on Streep. In fact, almost nothing else seems to matter to him... But while Nichols is servicing his star, he lets the other areas of the film go slack... [He] is finely attuned to the natural surreality of a movie set, but when he moves away from the show-biz satire and concentrates on the mother-daughter relationship, the movie falters."

Awards and nominations

American Film Institute recognition:
 AFI's 100 Years... 100 Laughs – Nominated

References

External links
 
 
 Postcards From the Edge at the Sony Pictures Entertainment Museum
 

1990 films
1990s English-language films
1990 comedy-drama films
American comedy-drama films
Films about bipolar disorder
Columbia Pictures films
Films about drugs
Films about actors
Films about dysfunctional families
Films based on American novels
Films based on autobiographical novels
Films directed by Mike Nichols
Films set in Los Angeles
Films with screenplays by Carrie Fisher
Films à clef
Films about mother–daughter relationships
1990s American films